Dowry Kalyanam is a 1983 Indian Tamil-language black comedy film, directed by Visu and produced by S. Suseela. The film stars Visu, Vijayakanth, Srividya, S. Ve. Shekher and Viji. It is based on Visu's play Dowry Kalyana Vaibhogame. The film was released on 31 May 1983.

Plot 

Ganeshan and Ethiraj are best friends and colleagues. Ethiraj is a widower and an alcoholic while Ganeshan is married and has a sister and a brother. Ganeshan does not earn enough and borrows from Ethiraj and Rowthar, a Muslim man who runs a grocery shop, frequently.

A misunderstanding arises when Ethiraj's mother proposes marriage between Ganeshan's sister and Ethiraj leading to a rift in their friendship. He challenges that he would get his sister married in a pompous manner.

However, the groom's family is behind dowry. The mother of the groom runs the family tyrannically. How Ganeshan struggles to make ends meet with many subplots makes it an interesting movie to watch.

In the end, with help from many people, he gets his sister married only for his own sister to ask him about the remainder of the dowry thereby denoting the cycle of dowry will forever continue.

Cast 

Visu as Ganesan
Vijayakanth as Ethiraj
Srividya as Uma
S. Ve. Shekher as Manggupathi
Viji as Gowri
Kishmu as Acharapakkam Raja Kalavai
Pushpalatha as Arcot Rushyendramani
M. N. Nambiar as Rowthar
Manorama as Seetha Latchmi
Vennira Aadai Moorthy as Karar Kandhasamy
V. K. Ramasamy as Jalandar Subbudu (Ganesan's uncle)
V. Gopalakrishnan as Kuselan (Ganesan's maternal uncle)
Delhi Ganesh as Kuselan
Gundu Kalyanam as Kalyanam 
M. R. Rajamani as Neelaganda Sastrigal
S. R. Janaki as Ganesan's grandmother

Soundtrack 
The music was composed by M. S. Viswanathan, with lyrics by Vaali.

Release and reception 
Dowry Kalyanam was released on 31 May 1983. Kalki wrote .

Censorship controversies 
Visu mentioned that the censor board wanted 87 cuts for the film as they were not impressed with the portrayal of the character Rowther (M. N. Nambiar) speaking in Hindi mixed with Tamil because Rowthers speak pure Tamil. Visu had to come up with the scene where he explains about his portrayal.

References

External links 
 

1980s black comedy films
1980s Tamil-language films
1983 films
Films about Indian weddings
Films directed by Visu
Films scored by M. S. Viswanathan
Films with screenplays by Visu
Indian black comedy films